Andrea Darvi (born July 29, 1952, as Andrea Margolis), now known as Andrea Plate, is a social worker and author and a former child actress mainly working in American television in the 1960s.

Her roles were all in mainstream adult productions. Although she appeared in many TV episodes as a featured character, she was never classified as a child star. A popular choice in casting, she was a familiar face on American television. Her career peaked in 1964 when she was 12 years old.

Acting career
The daughter of Samuel and Evelyn Margolis, she had her acting debut in the 1960 The Twilight Zone episode, "The Night of the Meek". She appeared again in the 1961 episode, in a show stopping turn as Estrellita Gallegos in “Dust". The same year, she appeared in episodes of 87th Precinct, Peter Gunn and The Untouchables, returning to the latter in another episode in 1962, followed by episodes of Bonanza, Pete and Gladys, Hawaiian Eye and Adventures in Paradise.

In 1963 she appeared in The Danny Thomas Show and an episode of Death Valley Days. In 1964 she appeared as “Amity”, the title character in the S9E27 offering “Owney Tupper Had A Daughter” on Gunsmoke. She appeared as Nezhmet in a 1966 episode of I Spy. She appeared in 4 episodes of the TV series Combat!, including one 1966 episode named after her character "Gitty". She appeared in the Disney movie Monkeys Go Home, and appeared as Greti Koska in Alfred Hitchcock's Torn Curtain in 1966. She largely retired from acting in 1966 to pursue an education. She made one final appearance in 1971 in The Night God Screamed.

Family
In 1979 she married journalist Tom Plate, who later became a professor at UCLA. They live in Beverly Hills. They have one child and two grandchildren.

Post-acting career/published works
Darvi, a licensed clinical social worker (LCSW) in California, worked for the Department of Veterans Affairs for nearly 15 years (2003–17). She authored Pretty Babies: An Insider's Look at the World of the Hollywood Child Star, published in 1983. In 2019, she authored the internationally published Madness: In the Trenches of America's Troubled Department of Veterans Affairs (Marshall Cavendish Intl.)

References

External links

 Madness by Andrea Plate

1952 births
Actresses from Los Angeles
21st-century American women
Living people